This is a list of players who have played or currently playing in the Philippine Basketball Association.

K

L

M

N

O

More PBA player lists
A–E  F–J  K–O  P–T  U–Z

References

Hardcourt: The Official Philippine Basketball Association Annual

External links
Official website
MYPBA.com
http://pba-online.net/teams/

K

tl:Talaan ng mga manlalaro ng Philippine Basketball Association